Kettle Foods, Inc. is an American manufacturer of potato chips, based in Salem, Oregon, United States, with a European and Middle East headquarters in Norwich, United Kingdom. As of 2006 they were the largest natural potato chip brand in the U.S.

The company, founded in 1978 by Cameron Healy as "N.S. Khalsa Company", was previously sold to Lion Capital in 2006 and was owned by Diamond Foods from 2010 to 2016. In February 2016, Snyder's-Lance finalized their purchase of Diamond Foods. Snyder's-Lance (and their Kettle Foods division) was purchased by Camden, New Jersey-based Campbell Soup Company in March 2018.

History 
The company was founded by Cameron Healy in 1978 as the "N.S. Khalsa Company"; it produced its first potato chips in 1982.

In 1988, following a motorcycle trip taken by the company's founder and his son, Kettle Foods established a UK branch in a converted shoe factory in Norwich, Norfolk, England; the branch moved five years later to its current UK home, a newly built factory on the outskirts of Norwich.

In 2003, the company installed the largest solar array in the Pacific Northwest with the goal of using more green energy at their Salem plant.

The company was sold in 2006 to a British private equity group, Lion Capital LLP, for $280–320 million.

In September 2007, the company opened its second US production facility in Beloit, Wisconsin, after receiving $500,000 in state economic development money. Kettle built the first manufacturing plant to be awarded gold certification in the LEED program from the United States Green Building Council.

In October 2007, campaigns were launched on Facebook calling for a boycott of Kettle Foods products following allegations that the company was attempting to dissuade workers at its Norwich factory from joining trade union Unite. The company denied the claim but acknowledged that it had taken advice from Omega Training, a UK subsidiary of the U.S. company The Burke Group, specialists in union avoidance.

In August 2008, California Attorney General Jerry Brown announced a settlement with Kettle Foods, the makers of Cape Cod Potato Chips, and Frito-Lay for violating the state's Safe Drinking Water and Toxic Enforcement Act. The state had alleged in 2005 that the potato chips from the companies failed to document that they contained high levels of acrylamide, a carcinogen. Kettle Foods paid $350,000 in civil penalties and costs and agreed to cut their potato chips' levels of acrylamide to 275 parts per billion by 2011, an 87% reduction.

Lion Capital put Kettle Foods up for sale in December 2009, with an asking price of around US$700 million and in February 2010 sold it for $615 million to California-based Diamond Foods, which owns brands such as Pop Secret popcorn. The sale was finalized the following month.

Outside of the US and UK
The Kettle Foods UK office also supports a network of independent distributors through which Kettle Foods' products are made available to countries in Europe, the Middle East, and Southeast Asia, including Austria, Belgium, Denmark, Finland, France, Germany, Greece, Iceland, India, Ireland, Israel, Italy, Luxembourg, Malta, Malaysia, Netherlands, Norway, Portugal, Singapore, Spain, Switzerland, and Sweden.

Kettle Foods is unaffiliated with the Kettle Chip brand sold in Australia which is owned by Snack Brands Australia.

Potato chips
Kettle Foods products, marketed as all-natural, is best-known for its potato chips. Their potato chips are fried using expeller-pressed high-monounsaturated safflower and/or sunflower and/or canola oil. The company has occasionally held contests to introduce new flavors. The 2006 contest winners were "Tuscan Three Cheese" and "Buffalo Bleu", a spicy, savory chip; past contest winners include "Cheddar Beer", "Jalapeno Jack" and "Spicy Thai".

Ingredients 
As of 2016, the ingredients for the company's most basic chip ("Sea Salt") were: potatoes, safflower and/or sunflower and/or canola oil, sea salt.  Many other flavors use ingredients like natural flavors, spices, citric acid, and yeast extract.

Flavors
The following is a list of potato chip flavors sold by the company (as of 2018):

United States

 Backyard Barbeque
 Bourbon BBQ
 Dill Pickle (Krinkle Cut)
 Honey Dijon
 Habanero Lime (Krinkle Cut)
 Jalapeño 
 Korean BBQ
 Carolina BBQ
 New York Cheddar
 Pepperoncini 
 Parmesan Garlic
 Salt & Fresh Ground Pepper (Krinkle Cut)
 Sea Salt
 Sea Salt & Vinegar
 Sour Cream & Onion
 Spicy Queso (Krinkle Cut)
 Spicy Thai
 Sriracha
 Truffle & Sea Salt (Krinkle Cut)
 Unsalted
 Jalapeno Jack
 Red Chili
 Salsa with Mesquite

United Kingdom

 Crispy Bacon & Maple Syrup 
 Gressingham Duck (Plum Sauce and Spring onion) 
 Jalapeño Chilli
 Lightly Salted
 Mature Cheddar & Red Onion
 No Added Salt
 Sea Salt with Crushed Black Peppercorns
 Sea Salt & Balsamic Vinegar
 Smoky Barbecue
 Sour Cream and Onion
 Spicy Chilli
 Steakhouse Barbecue
 Sweet Chilli (& Sour Cream)

Rest of Europe and the Middle East, as of 2013

 Sea Salt
 Honey Barbecue
 Sweet Chilli & Sour Cream
 Sour Cream & Sweet Onion
 Sea Salt, Rosemary & Garlic
 Crispy Bacon & Maple Syrup
 Mature Cheddar & Red Onion
 Sea Salt and Balsamic Vinegar
 Sea Salt & Crushed Black Pepper
 Chilli with Jalapeño & Red Chillies 

Notes

References

External links
 

Brand name snack foods
Brand name potato chips and crisps
Snack food manufacturers of the United States
Food manufacturers of the United States
Companies based in Salem, Oregon
Beloit, Wisconsin
Companies based in Norwich
Food and drink companies established in 1978
2006 mergers and acquisitions
2010 mergers and acquisitions
2016 mergers and acquisitions
1978 establishments in Oregon
Snyder's-Lance Inc. brands